Deviant is the third album by Swedish goregrind band Regurgitate. It was released in 2003 by Relapse Records. It was released in Japan on 2 May 2003.

Track listing 

 "Drowning in Filth" – 1:14
 "Embrace Obscenity and Kiss the Eruption of Destruction" – 0:57
 "Seal Your Doom" – 1:09
 "Grotesque Anoplasty" – 0:51
 "Blind Fiends of Chaos" – 1:54
 "Visions of Sodomy" – 0:37
 "Severe Necrotic Manifesto" – 1:43
 "Annihilation Meets Depravation" – 1:04
 "Amphigory" – 0:45
 "Screams of Death Your God Won't Hear" – 1:14
 "Reeking Hellhole" – 0:31
 "Lethean Sleep" – 0:29
 "Waging War on Benevolence" – 1:03
 "Exterminate the Virtuous" – 1:54
 "Alone in Oblivion" – 1:18
 "Deviant Malpratice" – 1:21
 "The Ultimate Enslavement" – 1:06
 "Systematic Demoralization" – 1:24
 "Unfed" – 0:24
 "Manipulation Reigns Supreme" – 1:39
 "Charred Remains (Unseen Terror)" – 1:17
 "Crossed Out Existence" – 1:18
 "Vice and Iniquity" – 1:14
 "Lobotochrist" – 0:36
 "Twisted Rhymes of Perversion" – 1:51
 "Depopulation of the Human Race" – 0:47
 "Life Falls Before Our Feet" – 2:13

Personnel 

 Rikard Jansson – vocals
 Urban Skytt – guitar
 Glenn Sykes – bass, vocals
 Jocke Pettersson – drums

References

2003 albums
Regurgitate (band) albums
Relapse Records albums